Shalban Bihar (Sanskrit;  Shalban Bihar) is an archaeological site in Moinamoti, Comilla, Bangladesh. The ruins are in the middle of the Lalmai hills ridge, and these are of a 7th-century Paharpur-style Buddhist Bihar with 115 cells for monks. It operated through the 12th century.

Excavations have revealed many archaeological artifacts dated to between the 7th and 12th centuries.

History

The Vihara was founded in the eighth century by Bhava Deva, the fourth ruler of the Early-Deva dynasty. The 168 square meters site was built in or on the outskirts of Devaparvata, the Samatata capital bordering the Lalambi forest. The site was, previously known as Shalban Rajar Bari or King's residence at Shalban, was renamed Shalban vihara after archeological excavation revealed terracotta seals and copper plates identifying it as the remains of a residential Buddhist monastery.

Geography
About eight kilometres west of Comilla town, lies a range of low hills known as the Mainamati-Lalmai range which is dotted with more than 50 ancient Buddhist settlements dating from the 8th to the 12th centuries. Almost at middle is the Shalvan Vihara of 115 cells built around a spacious courtyard with a cruciform temple in the centre. About 5 kilometres north of Shalvan Vihara is Kutila Mura, which is a picturesque relic of a unique Buddhist establishment.

Exploration and excavation 

Deep diggings have revealed four repair and rebuilding phases in the monastery, the earliest corresponding to period III of the cruciform central shrine. No monastery remains corresponding to period I and II (7th century AD) has yet been found. Some scanty and ill-defined remains below the present structure may suggest their existence, probably of smaller size. During the next two phases (period IV and V: 9th–10th centuries AD) new floors and thresholds were built on top of earlier remains. Two interesting features observed inside the cells, fireplaces and ornamental brick-pedestals, were not included in the original plan. Though there was a community kitchen and dining establishment, many of the resident monks (probably sramanas: lay-students) preferred to cook their meals individually inside their cells. The pedestals certainly served the purpose of private cult worship. Discoveries made during explorations and excavations suggests that this establishment may probably have some provision for accommodating poorer lay students (sramanas) from neighbouring settlements with cheaper arrangements for cooking their own food with materials brought from home, an age-old practice  still in vogue in certain parts of rural Bengal .
Excavations at Shalban Vihara have also exposed a number of subsidiary structures including a community dining establishment, a small oblong, a pillared and a square shrine with exquisitely moulded plinth, two oblong chapels and a number of small votive stupas inside, and an interesting medium-sized shrine with a small sanctum connected by a long narrow passage and enclosed by a solid and massive brick structure, a columned terrace and colonnades just outside the monastery quadrangle.

Architecture

The large square monastery of 550-foot sides with 115 monastic cells, a dominant central shrine and a number of subsidiary shrines. Stupas and chapels, provides access through its monumental gateway on the north. While the central shrine revealed six building phases and the monastery four. The 1st and 2nd phases of the central shrine remains buried under the ruins of the 3rd, 4th and 5th periods but the remains of the 6th phase have been removed from the top. The cruciform central shrine of third built with the monastery as a single complex.

Staircases
In the middle of each wing, the monastery verandah is provided with a shallow projection to serve as the base for a flight of steps leading down to the brick-paved courtyard, the arrangement in the front side being larger and more elaborate. Compared to them, the arrangement in each corner of the monastery is a grand affair. Here, occupying a pair of cells, a solidly built broad and massive staircase leads to the roof or an upper floor. Such elaborate arrangements coupled with the evidence of a strong roof naturally suggest the existence of an upper storey. Oh

Chapels
The central cell in each wing is larger, stronger and more elaborate with certain special features such as small pedestals and platforms with decorative mouldings, larger niches, etc. By analogy to similar arrangements in Nalanda and Paharpur monasteries, they certainly represent subsidiary chapels or shrines.

Niches
Each of the cells were originally provided with three excellently built corbelled niches in the inner walls, the one in the back wall being larger. Objects recovered in and around them strongly indicate that these were primarily intended for keeping votive images, oil lamps and reading and writing materials.

The central shrine
The shrine at Shalban Vihara is actually not but six different structures built successively on the same spot in different periods and on different plans. They provide interesting evidence of the evolution and gradual transforming of the traditional Buddhist stupa architecture into that of the Hindu temple. The remains of the first two periods are hidden below the cruciform shrine of period III which was built with the monastery as a single complex. It is an exceedingly interesting piece of architecture resembling in ground plan a Greek cross, 51.8m long with chapels built in the projecting arms. Its basement walls are embellished with a string course of delightfully sculptured terracotta plaques set within parallel bands of ornamental bricks. This shrine bearing a striking resemblance with that of Paharpur represents a fully developed and finished example of the 7th- to 8th-century Buddhist temple architecture of Bengal. Since the Mainamati monuments are unquestionably earlier in date by about a century, and as there are a number of early and intermediary stages of development in this evolutionary process clearly traceable in Mainamati. Mainamati supplied prototypes of cruciform shrines not only for Paharpur and Vikramashila in eastern India but also for the subsequent Buddhist architectural development in Burma, Indonesia and Indochina. The next two periods (IV and V) witnessed an interesting further transformation and development in the plan of the central shrine, the cruciform shape being replaced by an oblong one. Now fully open, spacious and functional, it is much nearer to a Hindu temple. In these structural changes may lie the primary reason for discontinuing the earlier Buddhist tradition of the delightful terracotta decorations in the early Muslim architecture of Bengal, though in a somewhat different form. The main interest in these evolved shrines shifted from the outer walls around the circumambulatory path to the inner chambers with space enough for images, sculptures and architectural decorations, and specially to the principal cult images consecrated in them.

Materials found

The finds from excavations at Shalban Vihara have been very rich and valuable which include seven copper-plate inscriptions, about 350 golds and a large number of sculptural specimens in stone, bronze and terracotta, and innumerable terracotta sculptured plaques found both in situ and otherwise.

See also
 Somapura Mahavihara
 Bikrampur Vihara
 Kantajew Temple
 Shahbaz Khan Mosque
 Mainamati
 Chawk Mosque
 Bagha Mosque
 Khan Mohammad Mridha Mosque
 Sixty Dome Mosque
 Saat Masjid
 Lalbagh Fort
 List of archaeological sites in Bangladesh

References

External links

Buddhist sites in Bangladesh
Ruins in Bangladesh
Cumilla District
Buddhist monasteries in Bangladesh
Buddhist universities and colleges
Ancient universities of the Indian subcontinent
Buildings and structures in Chittagong Division
Former populated places in Bangladesh
History of Chittagong Division
9th-century Buddhist temples
Archaeological sites in Comilla district